Hamotus elongatus is a species of ant-loving beetle in the family Staphylinidae.

References

Further reading

 

Pselaphitae
Articles created by Qbugbot
Beetles described in 1890